Paul A. Chase (November 13, 1895 – July 31, 1963) was a Vermont military officer, attorney, and public official.  He served as an associate justice of the Vermont Supreme Court from 1953 to 1956.

The son of a prominent attorney and brother of Harrie B. Chase, who served as a federal judge, Paul Chase was born in Whitingham, Vermont and raised in Brattleboro.  He attended Amherst College, served in the Army during World War I, and returned home to study law with his father and brother.  After admission to the bar, Chase served in prominent government positions during the 1920s including state commissioner of taxes and special assistant to the United States Attorney General.

After practicing law in Vermont throughout the 1930s, and serving in the National Guard and organized Reserve, Chase returned to active duty for World War II and attained the rank of colonel as a member of the Judge Advocate General Corps.  After service in the Pacific and with units in the United States, he returned to Vermont to resume practicing law.  His post-war ascent was rapid and he moved quickly from member of the Vermont House of Representatives to Chairman of the Vermont Public Service Commission to Judge of the Vermont Superior Court.

In 1953, Chase was appointed an Associate Justice of the Vermont Supreme Court and he served until increasingly ill health forced him to retire in 1956.  Chase died in Townshend, Vermont and was buried in Brattleboro.

Early life
Paul Addison Chase was born in Whitingham, Vermont on November 13, 1895, the son of attorney Charles Sumner Chase and Carrie (Brigham) Chase.  His siblings included Harrie B. Chase, who served on the Vermont Supreme Court and the United States Court of Appeals for the Second Circuit.  Chase was raised in Brattleboro, and he graduated from Brattleboro High School in 1914.  Chase attended Amherst College as a member of the class of 1918, and left during his junior year to join the United States Army for World War I.

World War I
First assigned to the 151st Depot Brigade at Camp Devens, Massachusetts, after completing his initial training Chase was assigned to the 304th Infantry Regiment a subordinate command of the 76th Division.  By September 1918, Chase was attending the signal school at the 1st Depot Division in France, where he was trained to lay telephone cable and install and operate field telephones and switchboards.  Subsequently assigned to the headquarters of the 148th Infantry Regiment, a unit of the 37th Division, he took part in combat during October and November, including the Battle of Saint-Mihiel, and fighting around Avocourt during the Meuse-Argonne Offensive.

Chase remained in Europe for post-war occupation duty, and was promoted to corporal in December 1918.  He returned to the United States in April 1919, and was discharged at Camp Devens.  After the war, he took part in organizing the American Legion in Vermont, and was the state organization's first finance officer.

Following his discharge from the Army, Chase joined the Vermont National Guard's 43rd Infantry Division.  He was promoted to sergeant, and served until being discharged in 1923.

Early career
After the war, Chase studied law with his father and brother.  In January 1921, he was appointed assistant secretary of the Vermont Senate, and in March, he was elected Brattleboro's grand juror (prosecutor in the municipal court).  Chase was admitted to the bar in 1922, and practiced as a member of his father's firm.

In February 1925, Chase was appointed as Vermont's Commissioner of Taxes.  He served until July 1925, when he resigned in order to accept appointment as special assistant to John G. Sargent during Sargent's term as United States Attorney General.  After Sargent left office at the end of Calvin Coolidge's presidency in 1929, Chase remained on the staff of Sargent's successor William D. Mitchell in order to facilitate the transition between Sargent and Mitchell.

Continued career
In July 1930, Chase joined the Ludlow law firm of Sargent and William W. Stickney.  He also joined the board of directors of the Ludlow Savings Bank and Trust Company, and later served as the bank's president.  In 1934, Chase returned to the National Guard and was commissioned as a captain of Infantry.  In 1938, he transferred his military membership to the Organized Reserve Corps, and he was commissioned as a captain in the Judge Advocate General Corps.

World War II
During World War II, Chase was activated as a member of the 43rd Infantry Division staff, and took part in the unit's training at Camp Blanding, Florida, Camp Shelby, Mississippi, and in New Zealand.  Assigned as the division's judge advocate, he was promoted to lieutenant colonel, and he served in the occupation of New Caledonia.  When the 43rd Division moved on to occupy Guadalcanal and the Russell Islands, Chase was assigned to serve as judge advocate for all forces on New Caledonia, and he was promoted to colonel in June 1943.

In April 1944, Chase was assigned as judge advocate for the Boston-based 1st Service Command, the Army Service Forces unit that oversaw wartime personnel and logistics management for the New England Region.  In May 1945, Chase was appointed to a two-year term as professor of military science and tactics at Norwich University.  In May 1947, Chase was appointed to the military staff of Governor Ernest W. Gibson Jr. with the rank of colonel, and he served until becoming a judge in 1948.

Later career
In 1945, Chase was elected president of the Vermont Bar Association, and he completed the one-year term left vacant by the death of Leonard F. Wing.  In January 1946 he was elected to the board of trustees of the Vermont Soldiers Home.  In November 1946 Chase was the successful Republican nominee to represent Ludlow in the Vermont House of Representatives.

Chase was serving in the legislature in April 1947 and was chairman of the House Judiciary Committee when he was appointed to the Vermont Public Service Commission.  He was selected to serve as the commission's chairman, and held the post until September 1948, when he was appointed a judge on the Vermont Superior Court.  He advanced through seniority to become the chief judge in 1952, and served on the court until 1953.

In June 1953, Associate Justice Stephen S. Cushing resigned from the Vermont Supreme Court.  Chase was appointed to the vacancy, in keeping with Vermont's tradition of promoting the chief judge of the Superior Court.  In June 1956, news accounts indicated that Case and his wife were in ill health, and had gone to California to recuperate.  Chase had not informed the governor or the chief justice of his location or the reasons for his absence, and the court's caseload backed up because Chase did not complete or submit the opinions assigned to him to author.  As a result of Chase's absence, Chief Justice Olin M. Jeffords requested his resignation.  Chase was initially resistant, and said he intended to return to work and seek appointment to a new two-year term in 1957.  He later changed his mind, and he submitted his resignation in August 1956.  He was succeeded on the court by James Stuart Holden.

Awards
In 1953, Chase received the honorary degree of Master of Arts from Amherst College.

Retirement and death
In retirement, Chase was a resident of Newfane.  He died at the hospital in Townshend on July 31, 1963, and was buried at Morningside Cemetery in Brattleboro.

Family
In 1926, Chase married Doris Eleanor Dexter of Philadelphia.  They were the parents of a son, Charles Dexter Chase (1927-1999).

References

Sources

Newspapers

Internet

Books

External links

1895 births
1963 deaths
People from Whitingham, Vermont
People from Brattleboro, Vermont
People from Ludlow (town), Vermont
People from Newfane, Vermont
Vermont lawyers
U.S. state supreme court judges admitted to the practice of law by reading law
Republican Party members of the Vermont House of Representatives
Justices of the Vermont Supreme Court
United States Army personnel of World War I
United States Army personnel of World War II
National Guard (United States) officers
Norwich University faculty
Burials in Vermont
Vermont National Guard personnel
20th-century American politicians
20th-century American judges
20th-century American lawyers